The European Open is a men's ATP Tour 250 tennis tournament that takes place in Antwerp, Belgium. It was introduced for the 2016 ATP World Tour.

Past finals

Singles

Doubles

See also 
 ECC Antwerp

References

External links 
 

 
Tennis tournaments in Belgium
Hard court tennis tournaments
Sports competitions in Antwerp
2016 establishments in Belgium
Recurring sporting events established in 2016
Autumn events in Belgium